Syntrichia is a large, cosmopolitan genus of mosses in the family Pottiaceae. The genus name is of Greek origin for "plus" and "hair", referring to the "twisted peristome united by a basal membrane".

, the World Flora Online accepts 114 species in the genus Syntrichia:

References

Moss genera